Terekti, until 2022 known as Fyodorovka is a village in north-western Kazakhstan. It is the administrative center of Terekti District in West Kazakhstan Region. Population:

Geography
The Ural River flows to the north of Terekti.

References

Populated places in West Kazakhstan Region